Romanian nationalism is the nationalism which asserts that Romanians are a nation and promotes the cultural unity of Romanians. Its extremist variation is the Romanian ultranationalism.

Parties

Current
Greater Romania Party (1991–present)
New Generation Party (2000–present)
Noua Dreaptă (2000–present)
Social Democratic Party (2001–present)
Romanian Socialist Party (2003–present)
People's Movement Party (2014–present)
United Romania Party (2015–present)
National Identity Bloc in Europe (2017–present)
Alliance for the Union of Romanians (2019–present)
Romanian Nationhood Party (2019–present)
The Right Alternative (2019–present)
Alliance for the Homeland (2021–present)
Force of the Right (2021–present)

Former
Romanian National Party (1881–1926)
Democratic Nationalist Party (1910–1946)
Bessarabian Peasants' Party (1918–1923)
Democratic Union Party (1919–1923)
National Italo-Romanian Cultural and Economic Movement (1921–1923)
National Romanian Fascio (1921–1923)
National Liberal Party (Romania, 1875) (1875–1947)
Romanian Communist Party (1921–1989)
National Fascist Movement (1923–1930s)
National-Christian Defense League (1923–1935)
Iron Guard (1927–1941)
National Liberal Party-Brătianu (1930–1938)
National Socialist Party (1932–1934)
Crusade of Romanianism (1934–1937)
Romanian Front (1935–1938)
Romanian National Unity Party (1990–2006)
Socialist Party of Labour (1990–2003)
Democratic National Salvation Front (1992–1993)
Everything For the Country Party (1993–2015)
Party of Social Democracy in Romania (1993–2001)
People's Party – Dan Diaconescu (2011–2015)

See also
Dacianism
Greater Romania
Great Union
National communism in Romania
National symbols of Romania
Territorial evolution of Romania
Unification of Romania and Moldova

References

 
History of Europe
Politics of Moldova
Politics of Romania